The 2010 Speedway World Cup Qualification (SWC) was a two events of motorcycle speedway meetings used to determine the two national teams who qualify for the 2010 Speedway World Cup. According to the FIM rules the top six nations (Poland, Australia, Sweden, Russia, Great Britain and Denmark) from the 2009 Speedway World Cup were automatically qualified.

Results

Heat details

Qualifying Round One 
1 May 2010
 Lonigo, Veneto
Pista Santa Marina (Length: 334 m)
Referee:  Christian Froschauer
Jury President:  Christer Bergstrom
References

Qualifying Round Two 
24 May 2010
 Abensberg, Bavaria
Speedwaystadion Abensberg (Length: 398 m)
Referee:  Anthony Steele
Jury President:  Armando Castagna
References

See also 
 2010 Speedway World Cup

References 

Q